Calliandra elegans is a plant species in the genus Calliandra found in Brazil.

References

 Calliandra elegans at plants.jstor.org

elegans
Flora of Brazil
Plants described in 1981